Antlers is a Canadian documentary film, directed by André-Line Beauparlant and released in 2009. The film centres on a group of caribou hunters in the rural Montcerf-Lytton area of Quebec.

The film premiered on February 21, 2007 at the Rendez-vous du cinéma québécois.

The film received a Genie Award nomination for Best Feature Length Documentary at the 28th Genie Awards in 2008.

References

External links
 

2007 films
2007 documentary films
Canadian documentary films
Quebec films
French-language Canadian films
2000s Canadian films